Autódromo Juan Manuel Fangio  is a  motorsports circuit located near Balcarce, Argentina. It has hosted events in the Turismo Carretera series. The 2011 race saw tragedy as young Argentine Guido Falaschi was fatally injured in a multi-car crash.

The track was named after Argentine racing legend, Juan Manuel Fangio, who was born in Balcarce.

External links
 

Motorsport venues in Buenos Aires Province